Italian pop tenor and crossover artist Andrea Bocelli has released seventeen pop, classical, and Latin studio albums, including one holiday album; three compilation albums; twenty two singles; four collaborative albums; eleven complete opera recordings; three live albums, and nine live video releases.

From the release of his debut album, Il Mare Calmo della Sera, after winning the Newcomers section of the Sanremo Music Festival, with the song of the same name, in 1994, to the release of his first holiday album, My Christmas, the best-selling holiday album and one of the best-selling albums of 2009, He has sold 75 million records worldwide. Thus, he is the biggest-selling singer in the history of Classical music.

In 1999, his nomination for Best New Artist at the Grammy Awards marked the first time a classical artist had been nominated in the category, since Leontyne Price, in 1961. The Prayer, his duet with Celine Dion for the animated film, The Quest for Camelot, won the Golden Globe for Best Original Song and was nominated for an Academy Award in the same category. With the release of his classical album, Sacred Arias, Bocelli captured a listing in the Guinness Book of World Records, as he simultaneously held the No. 1, 2 and 3 positions on the US Classical albums chart. The next three-and-a-half years followed with Bocelli holding permanent residency at the No. 1 spot. Six of his albums have since reached the Top 10 on the Billboard 200, and a record-setting 7, have topped the Classical albums charts, in the United States.

With 5 million units sold worldwide, Sacred Arias became the biggest-selling classical album by a solo artist of all time, and with just under 20 million units sold worldwide, his 1997 pop album, Romanza, became the best-selling album by an Italian artist ever, as well as the best-selling album by a foreign artist in Canada, and a number of other countries in Europe and Latin America. The album's first single, "Time to Say Goodbye", topped charts all across Europe, including Germany, where it stayed at the Top of the charts for fourteen consecutive weeks, breaking the all-time sales record, with over 3 million copies sold in the country. "Con te partirò", Bocelli's original solo version of the single, also became the best-selling single ever in Belgium, in 1996. He is widely regarded as the most popular Italian and classical singer in the world.

As of 2018, Andrea Bocelli has sold 25.2 million albums in United States. As of 1996, his first two albums have combined sales of 1.3 million sold copies.

Studio albums

Pop albums

Classical albums

Latin albums

Compilation albums

Live albums

Collaborative albums

Extended plays

Digital albums

Opera recordings

Singles

A  Note that the peak positions of "Con te partirò", "Macchine da guerra" and "Because We Believe" are for the Dutch-speaking Flanders region.
B  Note that the peak position of "Vivo per lei" is for the French-speaking Wallonia region.

Other charted songs

Videography

Video albums

Music videos

Bibliography 
 2000: The Music of Silence: A Memoir (La musica del silenzio) – Autobiography
 2010: The Music of Silence: A Memoir – Reworked autobiography

See also
 List of best-selling artists of all time

References

External links
 Bocelli on Ultratop.be
 Bocelli on acharts.us
 Bocelli on Official UK Charts
 2006 Andrea Music Week scans, Music Week article, 21 January 2006.

Discography
Classical music discographies
Discographies of Italian artists
Opera recordings
Opera singer discographies
Pop music discographies
Latin pop music discographies